Clepsis mehli is a moth of the family Tortricidae. It was described by Opheim in 1964. It is found along the coast of northern Norway and in Russia. The habitat consists of grassy meadows.

The wingspan is 15–17 mm. The ground colour of the forewings varies from greyish white to light yellow-grey. The pattern varies from reddish brown to reddish brown with a yellow tinge or olive brown.

References

Moths described in 1964
Clepsis